Irina Alexandrovna Khudoroshkina; born October 13, 1968) is a Russian shot putter.

She won the bronze medal at the 1996 Summer Olympics in Atlanta. She also finished second at the 1996 European Indoor Championships.

In 2004, she was suspended for a doping offense, her suspension lasting from April 2004 to April 2006.

She returned to finish seventh at the 2006 European Championships and win the silver medal at the 2007 European Indoor Championships. She competed at the 2008 Olympic Games without reaching the final.

Her personal best throw is 20.32 metres, achieved in May 1996 in Sochi. After the turn of the 21st century she has 18.92 metres as her best result, achieved in Moscow 2002 and Tula 2008.

See also
List of doping cases in athletics
List of Olympic medalists in athletics (women)
List of 1996 Summer Olympics medal winners
Shot put at the Olympics
List of European Athletics Indoor Championships medalists (women)

References

1968 births
Living people
Russian female shot putters
Olympic female shot putters
Olympic athletes of Russia
Olympic bronze medalists for Russia
Olympic bronze medalists in athletics (track and field)
Athletes (track and field) at the 1996 Summer Olympics
Athletes (track and field) at the 2008 Summer Olympics
Medalists at the 1996 Summer Olympics
Russian Athletics Championships winners
Doping cases in athletics
Russian sportspeople in doping cases